The Girl Who Couldn't Fly is an album by British folk musician Kate Rusby, released in 2005. The title refers to Rusby's fear of flying.

The album cover features a painting by Blur guitarist Graham Coxon.

Track listing
All songs by Kate Rusby unless otherwise stated.

"Game of All Fours" (Traditional, arranged by Rusby and John McCusker) – 3:40 
"The Lark" – 4:16
"No Names" – 3:28
"Mary Blaize" (Traditional lyrics, music by Rusby) – 3:25
"A Ballad" (Traditional lyrics, music by Rusby) – 4:50
"You Belong to Me" (Pee Wee King, Redd Stewart, Chilton Price)– 3:25
"Elfin Knight" (Traditional)– 4:04
"The Bonnie House of Airlie" (Traditional, arranged by Rusby and McCusker) – 5:39
"Moon Shadow" – 4:23
"Wandering Soul" – 4:12
"Fare Thee Well" – 3:41
"Little Jack Frost" – 4:24

Personnel
 Kate Rusby - vocals, guitar
 Roddy Woomble - vocals
 Kellie While - vocals
 Ian Carr - guitar, tenor guitar
 John McCusker - tenor guitar, guitar, cittern, fiddle, viola, whistle, piano
 Andy Cutting - accordion
 Ewen Vernal - double bass
 Andy Seward - double bass
 Donald Shaw - harmonium
 John Doyle - tenor guitar
 Kris Drever - tenor guitar
 Michael McGoldrick - flute, whistle
 Neil Yates - trumpet, horn
 Jim Fletcher - euphonium
 Matt Broadbent - tuba
 Keith Angel - snare drum
 Greg Lawson - violin
 Carole Howat - violin
 Steve King - viola
 Kevin McCrae - cello

References

=
2005 albums